Élan Recordings is an independent record label specializing in classical music.

History
Élan Recordings was established in 1985 by pianist Santiago Rodriguez and his wife, Natalia Rodriguez.  The catalogue features numerous Spanish/Latin recordings. It also features a number of historic re-releases. Santiago Rodriguez records exclusively for Élan.

Artists
Santiago Rodriguez, pianist
Carmen Balthrop, soprano
Elias Barreiro, guitar
Bibiano Borrato, guitar
Rudolfo Brito, pianist
Hsuan-Ya Chen, pianist
Mark Clinton and Nicole Narboni, duo pianists
Cuarteto Latinoamericano, string quartet
Evelyn Garvey, fortepiano
Jaemi Kim, pianist
André Laplante, pianist
Noel Lester, pianist
Raymond Lewenthal, pianist
Donald Manildi, pianist
Elmar Oliveira, violinist
Reubén Pelåez, pianist
Nathaniel Rosen, cellist
Thomas Schumaker, pianist
Sofia Philharmonic Orchestra
Earl Wild, pianist

References

Sources 
Ashby.  "Guide to Records: Santiago Rodriguez."  American Record Guide, Jul/Aug 1994, Vol. 57 Issue n. 4, pg. 155.
Cornelius, Stephen. "Pianist Searches For The Unexpected In The Music". Toledo Blade, September 27, 1996, p. 28
Gerber, L. "A Conversation with Santiago Rodriguez." Fanfare, 1992, Vol. 15 Issue n. 3, pp. 107–11.
Manildi, Donald.  "Guide to Records: Santiago Rodriguez."  American Record Guide, Jan/Feb 1995, Vol. 58 Issue n.1, p157.
March, Ivan; Greenfield, Edward; Layton, Robert. The Penguin Guide to Recorded Classical Music 2010. Penguin, 2009
McLellan, Joseph. "The Little Record Company That Could". Washington Post, April 1, 1990. 
McLellan, Joseph. "Some Big Names Fit Well on Small Labels".  Washington Post, Nov. 6, 1994.
McLellan, Joseph. "Santiago Rodriguez, Playing with Élan".  Washington Post, June 7, 1998. 
Phillip, Scott.  "Ginastera: Danzas Argentinas, Piano Sonata No. 1..."  Fanfare, July 1, 2010.

External links 
 elanrecordings.com
 santiagorodriguez.net

Classical music record labels
American record labels
Record labels established in 1985
1985 establishments in the United States